Kharkhoda is a town and a nagar panchayat in Meerut district in the Indian state of Uttar Pradesh.

Demographics
 India census, Kharkhoda had a population of 12,435. Men constituted 53% of the population and women 47%. Kharkhauda had an average literacy rate of 59%, about equal to the national average of 59.5%: male literacy was 66%, and female literacy was 48%. In Kharkhoda, 16% of the population was under 6 years of age.

References

Cities and towns in Meerut district